Mike Harper (born December 4, 1966) is considered to be one of America's leading opinion makers on NASCAR and ARCA RE/MAX Series racing topics. His Spin Out Zone column was established in 2001 and has grown into one of the industry's most popular racing web sites. In 2007, he joined forces with digital media artist Lori Munro and NASCAR writer Dennis Michelsen in the purchase of RaceTalkRadio.com.

The network has grown since 2007 from a web site hosting one Internet radio show to the nation's largest independent Internet radio network dedicated to racing. Racing programs include shows hosted by SPEED TV's Bob Dillner, XM Radio's Joe Castello and NASCAR Driver Greg Biffle. Shows include the SpeedFreaks and BAM Spirit (with Warner Music Nashville and Larry the Cable Guy). In addition to his work in racing media, Mike is a travel management industry veteran having worked with Fortune 500 corporations, small to mid-size companies and Universities on managing their travel programs.

Host
In 2007, Mike began hosting the only dedicated ARCA RE/MAX Series racing radio show in the nation called Inside the ARCA RE/MAX Series presented by Dale Jarrett Racing Adventure on RaceTalkRadio.com. Show talent included Lori Munro, Dennis Michelsen and Chris Knight. Today, the show has grown into one of the most successful racing programs in the industry. Supported by companies like Office Depot, GLOCK, CASITE, SPEED TV, AAA and Rockingham Speedway, the Thunder Crew (renamed in 2008) airs on RaceTalkRadio.com every Tuesday night (8pm to 11pm EST) with some of the biggest names in NASCAR, ARCA and the racing media.

Radio
Mike's racing updates have been heard on national networks like Fox Sports Radio and ESPN Radio. Local stations have picked up his updates including WHEELZ 104.5 FM in Mid-Michigan and 105.7 in Ohio.

Print - Magazine
In print media, Mike's Spin Out Zone column has been featured in SpeedWorld Magazine. SpeedWorld is a worldwide publication owned by Synergy Publishing International, a diversified multi-media communications corporation headquartered in Clearwater, Florida, U.S.A.

Print - Newspaper/Online
As a contributor, Mike's work has been published on SPEEDTV.com, ARCARacing.com, NASCAR industry's second largest media web site ThatsRacin.com which is produced by The Charlotte Observer, which is owned by The McClatchy Company, the second-largest newspaper company in the United States. Other newspaper contributions include The Hearst Corporation, one of the nation's largest diversified media companies. Its major interests include magazine, newspaper and business publishing, cable networks, television and radio broadcasting, internet businesses, TV production and distribution, newspaper features distribution and real estate.

Interviews
Mike has interviewed many ARCA and NASCAR stars, television executives/personalities from ESPN, Fox Sports and Speed Channel, and national personalities like wrestler/movie star Bill Goldberg and Commander in Chief of the United States Central Command from July 2000 through July 2003, General Tommy Franks.

Travel Management
For most companies “travel & entertainment” (T&E) costs represent the second highest controllable annual expense, exceeded only by salary & benefits.  Corporate travel management (CTM) is the function of managing a company's approach to travel by developing a travel policy, the negotiations with all vendors, day-today operation of the corporate travel program, traveller safety & security, credit-card management and T&E data management. As a business-to-business professional, Mike has managed all aspects of the travel program including business development, account management and operations management.

Personal life
Mike was born and raised in Texas and currently has residences in Michigan and Texas with his wife, Charlene and son, Tyler.

1966 births
Living people
NASCAR people